Rat Farm is the fourteenth full-length studio album by the Meat Puppets. It was released on April 16, 2013, through Megaforce Records.

Background and recording

Background and writing 
On writing the music Curt Kirkwood remarked: "I tried to write stuff that would stand on its own — just the chords and the melodies, and play it kind of straight... I think that was the guiding boundary that I gave myself. It was one of those things where a lot of times, in the past especially, Cris (bassist Cris Kirkwood) would go, ‘Well, that’s all there is? Let’s put a prog rock part in the middle.’ But I tried to hold it off as much as I could."

Content

Musical style 
Lucy Jones of British music publication NME adjudged Rat Farm as "gently fried country-rock and psychedelia" and its guitar solos to be "Neil Young-worthy".

Curt Kirkwood, the band's singer/guitarist and primary songwriter, described the album as "real blown-out folk music".

Reception
As of June 2013, based on 17 reviews, Rat Farm has a score of 74 on Metacritic, indicating "generally favorable reviews".  This is the highest score of their albums released since 2000. The Independent described the album as "dizzying psychedelic country in finest Meat Puppets tradition, full of slightly off-centre harmonies in Grateful Dead manner, and plenty of Kirkwood's swirling, trippy guitar."  Allmusic said: "The tracks on their 14th outing are the closest they've come in a long time to the colorful, no-frills brand of twangy alt-rock and informal punk (with hints of Americana, country, folk, and prog) that they instilled on their SST records."  The Austin Chronicle said that Curt Kirkwood "continues penning some of the strongest, sweetest, and compellingly twisted material of his already storied songwriting career," and that "[t]here's enough distorted weirdness, easygoing melodies, and guitar both hard and jangly to demonstrate why the Meat Puppets influenced both Nirvana and R.E.M."

Track listing

Personnel
Curt Kirkwood - vocals, guitars, arrangements
Cris Kirkwood - vocals, bass guitar
Shandon Sahm - drums, percussion

References

Meat Puppets albums
2013 albums
Megaforce Records albums